Khushhali Bank Limited is the first microfinance bank which is based in Islamabad, Pakistan. It was founded in 2000. 

It was a part of the Government of Pakistan's poverty reduction strategy and was developed with the facilitation of Asian Development Bank.

External links
 Official Website

References

Banks established in 2000
Pakistani companies established in 2000
Microfinance banks in Pakistan
Companies based in Islamabad
Pakistani subsidiaries of foreign companies